Rhododendron pruniflorum, the plum-flowered rhododendron, is an open, often rather leggy shrub found in northern Burma and nearby parts of India at elevations up to .
 
The aromatic leaves are often glaucous, and the undersides have a coating of fine, pale grey scales. As the name pruniflorum (plum-flowered) suggests, the small, waxy flowers are an unusual plum-purple-red shade, though they may also be mauve to pink. The heads of 3–10 small flowers open late, not until early summer at higher elevations.

References

pruniflorum
Flora of Assam (region)
Flora of Myanmar
Flora of Yunnan
Plants described in 1930